Volk en Staat (Dutch; "People and State") was a Flemish daily newspaper between 1936 and 1944, linked to the Fascist Flemish National League (Vlaamsch Nationaal Verbond, VNV) party. It was founded on 15 November 1936 and banned shortly after the liberation of Belgium from German control in 1944.

Volk en Staat had a circulation which peaked at between 40,000 and 50,000 copies sold each day.

1936 establishments in Belgium
1944 disestablishments in Belgium
Belgian collaboration during World War II
Defunct newspapers published in Belgium
Dutch-language newspapers published in Belgium
Fascist newspapers and magazines
Flemish Movement
Publications established in 1936
Publications disestablished in 1944